Local elections in the Philippines were held on May 9, 2016. This was conducted together with the 2016 general election for national positions. All elected positions above the barangay (village) level were disputed.

Electoral system
Every local government unit, be it a province, city, municipality or a barangay elects a chief executive (a governor, city mayor, municipal mayor and barangay chairman, respectively), and a local legislature (the Sangguniang Panlalawigan, Sangguniang Panlungsod, Sangguniang Bayan and Sangguniang Barangay, respectively), president upon by the chief executive's deputy (vice-governor, city vice-mayor, municipal vice-mayor, respectively; no equivalent for the barangay). In addition, the Autonomous Region in Muslim Mindanao (ARMM) elects a governor, vice-governor and members of the ARMM Regional Legislative Assembly.

Elections where one seat is being disputed, such as the regional governor and vice governor in the Autonomous Region in Muslim Mindanao, provincial governors and vice governors in each of the 81 provinces, and mayors and vice mayors in each of the 145 cities and 1,489 municipalities are elected via the plurality system.

Elections where more than one seat is disputed, such as for the membership in local legislatures, are done via plurality-at-large voting. For Sangguniang Panlalawigan seats, the Commission on Elections divides all provinces into at least 2 districts, while for Sangguniang Panlalawigan seats, the appropriation depends on the city charter (some are divided into districts, while others elect all councilors at-large), and for Sangguniang Bayan seats, all municipalities have eight councilors elected at-large, except for Pateros, which elects twelve, six in each district.

Participating parties
Parties that ran candidates in more than one province:

Regional elections

Provincial elections

The new province of Davao Occidental first voted for its provincial officials during this election.

Local parties are denoted by purple, independents by light gray, and ex officio members of the legislatures are in dark gray.

Summary of results, parties ranked by governorships won.

City and municipal elections
Summary of results, parties ranked by mayorships won.

Results for the ten largest cities:

Results for the ten largest municipalities:

Barangay elections

Barangay elections were supposedly to be held in October 2016 to end the election cycle, but were postponed by Congress to October 2017. The officials elected in 2013 will continue to serve up to 2017. By March 2017, Congress then postponed the election anew, this time to May 2018.

The barangay and Sangguniang Kabataan (SK) chairmen in a city or municipality will elect among themselves a representative each to sit in the town's Sangguniang Bayan (municipal council) or city's Sangguniang Panlungsod (city council), as the case may be. The municipal and city representatives of the barangay and SK chairmen, and the city and municipal councilors in every province then elect among themselves a representative each to the Sangguniang Panlalawigan (provincial board). The provincial and city (which are independent from a province) representatives of the SK chairmen will then elect themselves a president that shall sit as a member of the National Youth Commission. The same is true for the barangay chairmen, who shall be the president of the Liga ng mga Barangay (Association of Villages), and the councilors, who will be the president of the Philippine Councilors League.

References